Benny Weinbeck (born November 25, 1961 in Winsted, Minnesota) is an American jazz pianist, composer, and media producer.

He has released several albums and has appeared on Gordon Johnson's Trios V1 and V3 with Steve Gadd on drums and performed on many other artist recording projects. He composes music for independent feature films, documentaries, and commercial media. He performs around the U.S. and in Minneapolis with his jazz trio along with bassist Gordon Johnson and drummer Phil Hey.

Discography

As leader
 Make a Wish... (earthtone, 1991)
 Reflection (earthtone, 1992)
 Whispers (earthtone, 1993)
 Sweet Love (earthtone, 1999)
 Solo Piano Standards (earthtone, 2004)
 For Friends and Lovers (earthtone, 2010)
 Solvieg (soundtrack) (2014)
 Peaceful Christmas

As sideman
 Gordon Johnson, Trios V1 and Trios V3
 Michael Johnson, Moonlit Déjà Vu

References

 AllMusic
 https://web.archive.org/web/20151126122259/http://www.jazzpolice.com/content/view/5627/53/  Short Bio paragraph

External links
 Official site

American jazz pianists
American male pianists
American film score composers
Musicians from Minneapolis
1961 births
Living people
20th-century American pianists
Jazz musicians from Minnesota
21st-century American pianists
American male film score composers
20th-century American male musicians
21st-century American male musicians
American male jazz musicians